WDTK (1400 kHz) is a commercial AM radio station licensed to Detroit, Michigan, and known as "The Patriot."  It broadcasts a conservative talk radio format and is owned by Salem Communications.  The studios and offices are on Radio Plaza in Ferndale, Michigan, shared with sister station 1500 WLQV.

WDTK transmits with 1,000 watts non-directional.  The transmitter is on Midland Street near Hamilton Avenue in Highland Park, Michigan.  Programming is also heard on 99-watt FM translator W268CN at 101.5 MHz in Detroit.

Programming
Most of WDTK's weekday schedule is from the co-owned Salem Radio Network's line up of talk shows:  Hugh Hewitt, Mike Gallagher, Dennis Prager, Charlie Kirk, Sebastian Gorka and Brandon Tatum.  A local hour of talk is heard at 6pm, hosted by Darryl Wood.  WDTK also carries The Sean Hannity Show from Premiere Networks.  

On weekends, WDTK features shows on money, health, the outdoors and travel.  Syndicated weekend hosts include Gordon Deal, Eric Metaxas and Rudy Maxa.  Wayne State University football and basketball games are also broadcast on WDTK.  Most hours begin with an update from Townhall Radio News.

History

WMBC
The station began in November 1925 at 1170 kHz as WMBC.  The call sign stood for the station's original owners, the Michigan Broadcast Company.  WMBC's frequency changed to 1230 in 1927 and to 1420 in 1930.  WMBC was an early outlet for religious programming and gospel music in Detroit. 

It was also the home of conservative radio commentator Jerry Buckley, who was shot dead in the lobby of the LaSalle Hotel in 1930 after successfully campaigning for a mayoral recall election in which then-mayor Charles Bowles lost.

WJLB
WMBC's call letters were changed to WJLB in 1939 after the station was acquired by John Lord Booth (who renamed the station for himself).  In 1941, with the enactment of the North American Regional Broadcasting Agreement (NARBA), the station moved to its current home of 1400 kHz.  Being a small independent station, WJLB relied on brokered programming to pay the bills.  

Many of the paid shows were ethnic.  This included many programs targeted toward Detroit's African-American community.  One of WJLB's most popular programs during its early years was the Interracial Goodwill Hour, a jazz and R&B show hosted by later Cleveland radio legend Bill Randle.

By the 1960s, WJLB had competition for Detroit's black audience in the form of 1440 AM WCHB and later 107.5 FM WGPR.  At that point, WJLB evolved into a mostly R&B and soul music station, using the slogan "Tiger Radio" for a time in the late 1960s.  Perhaps WJLB's most well-known personality in the 1960s and 1970s was Martha Jean "The Queen" Steinberg.  She was one of the first successful female air personalities in Detroit, best known for her trademark line, "I betcha!"  On the evening of July 23, 1967 Steinberg got the station to cancel its regular programing and let her do a broadcast encouraging people to stop rioting.  In the early 1970s, Steinberg led the WJLB air staff in protesting the fact that the station employed no African-Americans outside of the air personalities.

WMZK and WQBH
In 1980, in response to the growing popularity of FM radio, WJLB-AM 1400 switched call signs and formats with its ethnic sister station, WMZK-FM 97.9.  WJLB-FM began broadcasting an urban contemporary format and has been among top-rated station in Detroit.  However, WJLB-FM dropped Steinberg's show.  Meanwhile, the AM station took the WMZK call letters and its ethnic format. 

Martha Jean the Queen found herself without a radio home until 1982, when a Steinberg-led group, the TXZ Corporation, purchased WMZJ 1400 AM.  The call letters were switched to WQBH (standing for the Queen Broadcasts Here).  WQBH took on a full-service format of R&B and urban gospel music, along with African-American oriented talk which would continue for over two decades.  With backing from the Michigan National Bank, Steinberg took full ownership of WQBH (as "Queen's Broadcasting Corporation") in 1997.  After Steinberg's death in January 2000, ownership of the station reverted to a consortium of her three daughters and the Order of the Fisherman Ministry.  WQBH continued to air broadcasts of Steinberg's past programs after her death.

WDTK
In March 2004, Salem Communications announced that it would be acquiring WQBH from the Steinberg family for $4.75 million.  The sale was finalized in May, and in September, Salem changed WQBH's call sign to WDTK, which stands for Detroit TalK.  It flipped the station to the current conservative talk format, using Salem Radio Network syndicated shows.

In late July 2012, WDTK added an FM translator.   W224CC broadcast on 92.7 FM, signing on at 99 watts of power.

In the Fall of 2014 the Patriot began covering the "Detroit Catholic High School League Game of the Week."  Jeremy Otto and Sean Baligian called the action. In 2015, the station added an afternoon drive time show hosted by Brendan Johnson.  Darryl Wood later replaced Johnson.

On November 18, 2016, WDTK stopped broadcasting on its FM translator at 92.7 FM.  It switched to a new translator in Oak Park, W268CN, on 101.5 FM.  The former translator on 92.7 remains on the air, but was repurposed as a repeater for sister station WLQV.  The translator on 101.5 is on the same frequency as Toledo station WRVF.  The two station's signals overlap in some suburbs south of Detroit.

Further reading
 "You're Gonna Like It... I Bet'cha!", chapter on Martha Jean "The Queen" Steinberg from Rockin' Down the Dial: A History of Detroit Radio from Jack the Bellboy to the Big 8, by David Carson (University of Michigan Press). Details Steinberg's early career in Detroit at WCHB-AM and WJLB-AM.

See also
Media in Detroit

References

External links
FCC History Cards for WDTK

DTK
Talk radio stations in the United States
Conservative talk radio
Radio stations established in 1925
1925 establishments in Michigan
Salem Media Group properties